Cooney State Park is a public recreation area bordering Cooney Reservoir,  south of Columbus in Carbon County, Montana. The state park occupies  on three sides of the reservoir, a  impoundment of Red Lodge Creek completed in 1937. The park offers boating, fishing, swimming, picnicking, and camping.

References

External links 
Cooney State Park Montana Fish, Wildlife & Parks
Cooney State Park Map Montana Fish, Wildlife & Parks

State parks of Montana
Protected areas of Carbon County, Montana
Protected areas established in 1970
1970 establishments in Montana